The Colorado Sports Hall of Fame (CSHoF) is a hall of fame and museum that honors — by public acknowledgment or commemoration — individuals who merit recognition and distinction for their exploits, accomplishments, and leadership in sports and athletic endeavors in the state of Colorado. The museum is located at Gate #1 on the west side of Empower Field at Mile High, in Denver, Colorado, and each year's inductees are honored on the Sports Legend Mall and Legacy Pillars that adjoin the Museum.

The Hall of Fame was incorporated on November 4, 1964, initially as a board of directors operating out of the Denver Chamber of Commerce.  It opened as a physical entity in August 2001, coincident with the opening of the sports stadium that hosts it.

Selection process
Inductees to the Colorado Sports Hall of Fame are chosen by an independent Selection Committee composed of (approximately 29) media representatives from throughout the State of Colorado.  Nominations are submitted by the public.  From these, the committee selects four to six inductees each year, considering each nominee's recognition and distinction in sports, and his or her achievements in bringing "fame and glory to the State of Colorado through outstanding accomplishments in athletic participation, teaching, coaching, administration, promotion, refereeing, ownership, reporting, or training".

Inductees
The members of the Colorado Sports Hall of Fame are:

See also
 Sports in Colorado

References

External links
 

All-sports halls of fame
State sports halls of fame in the United States
Halls of fame in Colorado
Sports museums in Colorado
Museums in Denver

Awards established in 1965
Museums established in 2001